Mark Gerard Miles (born 13 May 1967) is a British prelate of the Catholic Church who works in the diplomatic service of the Holy See. He has been named an archbishop and Apostolic Nuncio to Benin and Togo.

Biography
Mark Gerard Miles was born in Gibraltar on 13 May 1967. He was ordained a priest on 14 September 1996. He holds a degree in canon law. He prepared for a career in the diplomatic service at the Pontifical Ecclesiastical Academy and his early assignments included stints in Ecuador and Hungary and in Rome in the Section for General Affairs of the Secretariat of State.

During Pope Francis' visit to the Philippines and the United States in 2015, his simultaneous interpretation into English was highly commended by the public. In September 2015 Miles was awarded the Gibraltar Medallion of Distinction.

On 31 August 2019, Pope Francis named him Permanent Observer of the Holy See to the Organization of American States.

On 5 February 2021, Pope Francis appointed Miles Apostolic Nuncio to Benin and titular archbishop of Città Ducale. Miles is the first Gibraltarian to hold the rank of nuncio and the first to become an archbishop. On 2 March he was given responsibility for Togo as well.

See also
 List of heads of the diplomatic missions of the Holy See

References

External links 
 

Living people
Gibraltarian Roman Catholics
Pontifical Ecclesiastical Academy alumni
1967 births
Permanent Observers of the Holy See to the Organization of American States
Apostolic Nuncios to Benin
Apostolic Nuncios to Togo
Bishops appointed by Pope Francis